John Paul Visscher (1895–1950) was an American protozoologist.

Biography
Visscher was born in 1895 in Holland, Michigan. He got his A.B. degree from his hometown in 1917, and in 1920 and 1924 got his A.M. and Ph.D. degrees from Johns Hopkins University. He served in the U.S. Army during World War I where he was a Lieutenant in the Chemical Warfare Service. From 1920 to 1922 he served on his first position at Washington University in St. Louis where he was an Instructor of Zoology. Two years later he became Assistant professor of Biology at Western Reserve University. Another two years went by, and he received another promotion. This time he became Associate professor. Three years later he became professor, following by a Head of the Biology Department in 1937. He stayed at Western Reserve University till his death in 1950.

Visscher was well known for his discoveries in the protozoology field. He used to be a researcher who studied marine fouling of ships' bottom parts. Starting from 1922 to 1925 he worked as a special investigator for the United States Bureau of Fisheries, with whom he spent most of his summers. During this time he was busy with examination of marine fouling on the U.S. Navy and commercial ships. In 1928 he published his book, Nature and Extent of Fouling of Ships' Bottoms, which was based on his research. During 1935 and 1936, he worked at the United States Navy's Division of Construction and Repair with the same position that he had in 1920's. Ten years later, he became a consultant at the Naval Research Laboratory in Washington, D.C.

References

People from Holland, Michigan
1895 births
1950 deaths
Johns Hopkins University alumni
20th-century American zoologists
Case Western Reserve University faculty
Washington University in St. Louis faculty